Guro Knutsen Mienna (born Guro Knutsen on 10 January 1985) is a Norwegian former footballer who played for Røa IL of the Toppserien league and for the Norway women's national football team. 

She played alongside her older sister Marie Knutsen in the Norwegian team that finished fourth at the 2007 FIFA Women's World Cup in China.

Knutsen Mienna won the Norwegian league with Røa IL in 2007 and 2008, and also in 2008 won the Royal Cup to complete "the double".  She helped her club to the double again in 2009, and they won the Cup in 2010 and then the League in 2011.

Knutsen Mienna competed with Norway in the 2008 Summer Olympics in China and scored the opening goal in the group match against Japan.  Norway was defeated by Brazil in the quarter-finals.

In October 2008 Knutsen Mienna was one of five Røa players who announced their refusal to play for the national team under the management of Bjarne Berntsen. She was recalled by Berntsen's successor Eli Landsem and was selected for the 2011 FIFA Women's World Cup in Germany. Knutsen Mienna won a total of 36 senior caps and scored three goals for Norway.

She is a member of the Christian sports organization Kristen Idrettskontakt (KRIK) and is a medical student at the University of Oslo.  She married Kim André Mienna in April 2009.

Knutsen Mienna missed Røa's entire 2013 season due to pregnancy and announced her retirement from football in January 2014.

References

External links

 
 Norwegian national team profile 
 Røa club profile 

1985 births
Living people
Norwegian women's footballers
Norwegian Christians
Footballers from Trondheim
Røa IL players
2011 FIFA Women's World Cup players
Norway women's international footballers
2007 FIFA Women's World Cup players
Toppserien players
Olympic footballers of Norway
Footballers at the 2008 Summer Olympics
Women's association football midfielders